American rapper Eminem has obtained a series of statistical achievements, setting and breaking several world records with his participation in the musical scene for his videos, singles and albums. Eminem's first appearance in the Guinness Book of World Records was in 2000 for being the "fastest-selling rap artist" with his third album The Marshall Mathers LP. Since then, he has earned multiple appearances, 11 at least as of March 2021, including his record title as the top-selling hip hop artist of all time. Eminem is also a member of the Rock and Roll Hall of Fame, with his induction occurring in 2022.

Worldwide

Guinness World Records

Streaming

Lists

Great nicknames

United States

Billboard 200 chart statistics 

Eminem has had 10 studio albums in the top 10 of the Billboard 200, 9 of them being No. 1. Eminem's compilation album, two collaborative albums and two soundtrack albums all charted in the top 10 as well, with Curtain Call: The Hits and the 8 Mile soundtrack reaching No. 1. As part of D12 he recorded two studio album as part of the group and as part of Bad Meets Evil him and Royce da 5'9" recorded an extended play all of which reached No 1. Eminem's debut studio album Infinite and debut extended play Slim Shady EP are his only albums to not chart on the Billboard 200.

Eminem has the second most consecutive number-one studio albums at 10 behind Jay-Z who has 11. In 2013 after the release of The Marshall Mathers LP 2 Eminem had 8 albums in the top 200 simultaneously. Eminem's albums The Marshall Mathers LP and The Eminem Show are among the top 100 certified albums according to the RIAA, with the albums becoming one of the best-selling albums in United States with diamond status.

Billboard Hot 100 chart statistics 

Eminem has had 22 top-10 hits on the Billboard Hot 100, with 5 of them reaching No. 1. on the Billboard hot 100. In total 90 songs charted Billboard Hot 100. Eminem's singles "Lose Yourself", "Not Afraid" and "Love The Way You Lie" all charted at No. 1 and have been certified diamond or higher by the RIAA.

Billboard Hot Rap Songs statistics 

Eminem has had 31 top 10 hits on the Billboard Hot Rap Songs, with 5 of them reaching No. 1. on the Billboard Hot Rap Songs. In total 65 songs charted Billboard Hot Rap Songs.

United Kingdom

UK Album Chart 
Eminem has had 10 studio albums in the top 10 of the Official Albums Chart, 9 of them being No. 1. Eminem's compilation album, two collaborative albums and one of two soundtrack albums all charted in the top 10 as well, with Curtain Call: The Hits and the 8 Mile soundtrack reaching No. 1. As part of D12 he recorded two studio album as part of the group and as part of Bad Meets Evil him and Royce da 5'9" recorded an extended play, all of which reached the top ten with D12 World reaching No 1. Eminem's debut studio album, debut extended play and the Southpaw soundtrack are his only albums to not chart on the Official Albums Chart. Eminem holds the record for the most consecutive number one albums in Official Albums Chart history, with ten consecutive UK number one albums.

UK Singles Chart 

Eminem has had 33 top 10 hits on the UK Singles Chart, with 10 of them reaching No. 1. on the UK Singles Chart.

Canada

Billboard Canadian albums chart statistics 
Eminem has had 10 studio albums in the top 10 of the Billboard Canadian albums chart, 9 of them being No. 1. Eminem's compilation album, two collaborative albums and two soundtrack albums all charted in the top 10 as well, with Curtain Call: The Hits, the 8 Mile soundtrack and Shady XV reaching No. 1. As part of D12 he recorded two studio album as part of the group and as part of Bad Meets Evil him and Royce da 5'9" recorded an extended play all of which reached No 1. Eminem's debut studio album Infinite and debut extended play Slim Shady EP are his only albums to not chart on the Billboard Canadian albums chart.

Billboard Canadian Hot 100 statistics 

Eminem has had 3 top 10 hits on the Billboard Canadian Hot 100, with 1 of them reaching No. 1. In total 12 songs charted Billboard Canadian Hot 100.

See also 
 List of awards and nominations received by Eminem

References 

Records
Eminem